"(My My) Baby's Gonna Cry" is a song recorded by pop music duo Eurythmics.  It was written by group members Annie Lennox and David A. Stewart and produced by Stewart.  The song appears on the duo's album We Too Are One.

"(My My) Baby's Gonna Cry" marked two firsts for Eurythmics: this was the only single from the band which was released in the United States but not the UK and this is also the only single released by the duo to feature co-lead vocals by Lennox and Stewart.  Issued as the third American single from We Too Are One, the single failed to chart on the Billboard Hot 100. It did, however, chart in Canada, peaking at #58.

Lyrically Lennox sings the part of a woman asking her partner why he was "untrue" and whether he feels sorry for cheating, while he (Stewart) responds that the relationship makes him "feel sad", and he is "never coming back".  The song could be interpreted as the foreshadowing of Eurythmics near decade-long hiatus, as the duo's professional relationship was strained at the time of We Too Are One's release.

Track listing

CD Single
 "(My My) Baby's Gonna Cry" (Single Version) - 3:58  
 "(My My) Baby's Gonna Cry" (Remix) - 5:49  
 "(My My) Baby's Gonna Cry" (Acoustic Version) - 2:43

7" Single
A: "(My My) Baby's Gonna Cry" (Single Version) - 3:58
B: "(My My) Baby's Gonna Cry" (Acoustic Version) - 2:43

12" Single/Cassette
A1: "(My My) Baby's Gonna Cry" (Single Version) - 3:58    
A2: "(My My) Baby's Gonna Cry" (Acoustic Version) - 2:43   
B1: "(My My) Baby's Gonna Cry" (Single Version) - 3:58   
B2: "(My My) Baby's Gonna Cry" (Acoustic Version) - 2:43

Charts

References

1989 songs
1990 singles
Eurythmics songs
RCA Records singles
Songs written by David A. Stewart
Songs written by Annie Lennox
Song recordings produced by Dave Stewart (musician and producer)